WNUZ-LP (92.9 MHz) is a non-commercial, non-profit, educational low-power FM radio station licensed to Gap, Pennsylvania. The station is licensed to WLRI, Inc. It airs an All-News radio stations and information radio format. WNUZ-LP is affiliated with the Pacifica Radio Network. It also features the weekday syndicated shows from Thom Hartmann and Stephanie Miller.

Station history
WNUZ-LP is a full-service radio station licensed to serve the community of Gap, Pennsylvania, with a reach of Lancaster, Chester Southern Berks and Southeastern York Counties. WNUZ-LP broadcasts in FM stereo from transmitter facilities located in Christiana, Pennsylvania.

The station's original construction permit was granted on October 16, 2003, and initial broadcast took place shortly thereafter.

In fall 2009, the then-WLRI-LP began reading the Intelligencer Journal and Lancaster New Era newspapers on the air, under an exclusive agreement with Lancaster Newspapers, Inc. (now known as "LNP Media Group"). In summer 2010, WLRI-LP began reading the Sunday News newspaper. All three newspapers were renamed in 2014 and now go by "LNP" and "LNP Sunday News" respectively.

On July 12, 2013, WLRI-LP began airing programming from the Pacifica Radio Network and other community and non-commercial sources worldwide, along with live "in studio" news, weather, traffic and current affairs. Additional programming offerings from Pacifica Radio Network, WYD Media Management, Dan Delgado, SM Radio Productions, Mythical Intelligence, Inc., and Democracy Now! supplement daytime and some weekend on-air programming.

On March 17, 2015, WLRI-LP filed for a new construction permit to relocate the transmitter and improve its overall service area. The application was granted by the Federal Communications Commission on March 19, 2015.

On March 28, 2015, WLRI-LP was granted permission to relocate and increase TPO to 250 watts and ERP to 100 watts.

On April 20, 2015, control of WLRI-LP was transferred to WLRI Incorporated, a non-membership, non-profit private Pennsylvania corporation following the consummation of its previous licensee.

On June 15, 2015, WLRI-LP began operating at full power and applied for license to cover, subsequently granted.

On May 6, 2016, WLRI-LP announced that it began establishing an online public file and virtual front desk in compliance to Federal Communications Commission rule-makings passed in early 2016. On December 6, 2017, the station changed its call sign to WLYH-LP; the WLYH callsign was formerly used by the current WXBU. On December 25, 2017, the station changed its call sign back to WLRI-LP. On September 11, 2018, the station changed its call sign to WTPA-LP, and then back to WLRI-LP again on October 16, 2018. It again changed callsigns on June 1, 2020, this time to WNUZ-LP.

Network affiliations
On October 1, 2010, WLRI 93 FM officially became the first Pacifica Radio Network station in Southeastern Pennsylvania. It also airs the Thom Hartmann Show and the Stephanie Miller Show, Free Speech TV, Global Community Radio, On The Farm Radio and Keystone State News Connection reports.

References

External links
 
 

NUZ-LP
NUZ-LP
Radio stations established in 2005
2005 establishments in Pennsylvania
All-news radio stations in the United States
Lancaster County, Pennsylvania